Bangor Union Station was a passenger train station in Bangor, Maine. Long the state's second-largest railroad station, it was served by the Maine Central Railroad and the Bangor and Aroostook Railroad. In 1961, the railroads ended service to the station, which was then demolished to avoid an annual property tax of $10,788 on an assessed valuation of $372,000. 

The station site is now occupied by the Penobscot Plaza Shopping Center.

Construction
The station was designed for the Bangor & Aroostook and the Maine Central by architect Henry B. Fletcher, who had designed stations for the Boston and Maine Railroad. The station with a clock tower on the front was built of buff-colored brick with brownstone trimmings and base. The  clock tower was capped with a steeply peaked roof above an open octagonal cupola. The principal entrance was defined by a porte-cochère opening into an  vestibule to a -by- waiting room with an adjoining dining room, kitchen, and storeroom. A women's retiring room and toilet were to the right side of the vestibule, and the ticket office, agent's office, news stand, smoking room, and men's toilet were on the opposite side of the vestibule. Marble flooring was used in the entrance, waiting room, dining room, smoking room, and women's retiring room. The station included a  train shed covering eight tracks.

Location
The station was built on the west bank of the Penobscot River estuary, just upstream of the confluence with Kenduskeag Stream. The train shed extended upstream from the station, covering tracks between the station and the Penobscot River. Three tracks ran through and the remaining five were stubs extending downstream. The Maine Central Eastern Division main line extended upstream from the station to connect with the Canadian Pacific Railway to the Maritimes at Vanceboro, Maine. Maine Central Eastern Division branch line trains to Calais, Bar Harbor, or Bucksport required backing moves to cross the Penobscot River bridge approach upstream of the station. The stub tracks served trains crossing Kenduskeag Stream departing or arriving from the Bangor and Aroostook or from the Maine Central Portland Division to the Boston and Maine Railroad connection at Portland, Maine.

References

External links
Images of the station from Bangor Public Library

Buildings and structures in Bangor, Maine
Bangor and Aroostook Railroad
Demolished railway stations in the United States
Railway stations in Maine
Bangor, Maine
Maine Central Railroad stations
Railway stations in the United States opened in 1907
Transportation buildings and structures in Penobscot County, Maine
Former railway stations in Maine